George Walter "Sarge" Connally (August 31, 1898 – January 27, 1978) was a pitcher in Major League Baseball. He played for the Chicago White Sox and Cleveland Indians.

References

External links

1898 births
1978 deaths
People from McGregor, Texas
Major League Baseball pitchers
Chicago White Sox players
Cleveland Indians players
Baseball players from Texas